Dirty Tricks may refer to:

 Dirty Tricks (British Airways scandal)
 Dirty Tricks (film), a 1981 American comedy film
 Political sabotage, also known as ratfucking in the United States
 The Dirty Tricks, a Canadian rock band